This is the list of episodes of the anime Kiba. The anime aired on TV Tokyo from April 5 to March 27, 2007.

Episode list

References

Kiba